Weissenbach railway station is a railway station in the municipality of Boltigen, in the Swiss canton of Bern. It is an intermediate stop on the Spiez–Zweisimmen line and is served by local trains only.

Services 
The following services stop at Weissenbach:

References

External links 
 
 

Railway stations in the canton of Bern
BLS railway stations